Alberta Provincial Highway No. 68, commonly referred to as Highway 68 and officially named Sibbald Creek Trail, is a highway in central Alberta, Canada, west of Calgary. The road is paved for the final  to Highway 1 all other sections are gravel. It is provides access to hiking, horseback riding and hunting areas, Sibbald Lake Campground, private ranching operations and gas fields in the area. Through travellers can use it as an alternate route to Kananaskis Country.

Major intersections 
From west to east:

References 

068